The Jokers de Cergy-Pontoise (English: Cergy-Pontoise Jesters), formally known as Hockey club de Cergy-Pontoise, are a French ice hockey club based in Cergy, Val-d'Oise and representing the Cergy-Pontoise agglomeration. As of the 2021–22 season, they are the top ranked hockey team in the Paris Region, and the only one playing at the highest level of the French ice hockey pyramid, the Ligue Magnus.

History

Men's hockey
While the multisport Club des sports de glace de Cergy had offered a hockey program since 1977, the independent Hockey club de Cergy-Pontoise was founded in 1981.

For the following decades, its flagship men's team toiled in various minor leagues without much fanfare, playing out of Cergy's unspectacular municipal ice rink, a limited seating venue mostly designed for recreational activities. This changed in 2009, when the city was chosen by the French Ice Hockey Federation as the site of its future National Ice Hockey Center, brand new federation headquarters incorporating an arena slated to host most Team France training camps, as well as a local resident club. The building was inaugurated in 2016 under the name Aren'Ice.

Buoyed by the city's commitment to the sport and their attractive new venue, the Jokers earned promotion to the Ligue Magnus in 2020, as they stood atop the Division 1 standings (France's second level) when the season was cut short by the COVID-19 pandemic.

Women's hockey
Prior to the men's team's promotion to the top level, the club was most notable for its women's hockey section, which has won a record 18 senior national titles.

On 28 February 2004, women's team captain and Team France member Christine Duchamp became the first woman to take part in a non-recreational men's hockey game in France, when she skated 4:55 minutes in a Division 1 (second level) game against Asnières.

For its pioneering role in the development of the women's game, the club was inducted into the Builders category of the French Ice Hockey Hall of Fame in 2009, only the second organization to be so honored after Chamonix.

Trophies and awards
 French Women's Senior Championship
  (x18) 1991, 1992, 1993, 1994, 1996, 1997, 1998, 2000, 2001, 2002, 2003, 2004, 2005, 2006, 2007, 2008, 2009, 2017

 French women's Nationale 1 (inline hockey)
  (x2) 2006, 2007

Notable players

French Ice Hockey Hall of Fame
Gwenola Personne (2021)

References

External links
 Official professional section website 
 Official amateur section website 

Ice hockey teams in France
Sport in Val-d'Oise
Ice hockey clubs established in 1981
1981 establishments in France